Acacia gracilenta is a shrub belonging to the genus Acacia and the subgenus Juliflorae that is native to north Australia.

Description
It has brown to grey coloured bark and terete, pale to bright green branchlets that are glabrous or sometimes lightly hairy. Like most species of Acacia it has phyllodes rather than true leaves. The phyllodes occur singly but sometimes are appear in pairs, they have a more or less linear shape that can be very narrowly elliptical. It blooms between April and August producing yellow flowers. The seeds inside are arranged longitudinally and have a closed areole.

Taxonomy
The species was first formally described by the botanists Mary Tindale and P.G.Kodela in 1992 as part of the worki New species of Acacia (Fabaceae, Mimosoideae) from tropical Australia as published in the journal Telopea. It was reclassified by Leslie Pedley in 2003 as Racosperma gracilentum then transferred back to the genus Acacia in 2006.

Distribution
It is endemic to the top end of the Northern Territory where it is chiefly found in Arnhem Land, throughout Kakadu National Park and Nitmiluk National Park where it is often situated on plateaux and in gorges and on slopes growing in sandy soils usually near creeks or streams.

See also
List of Acacia species

References

External links
Acacia gracilenta occurrence data from the Australasian Virtual Herbarium

gracilenta
Flora of the Northern Territory
Plants described in 1992